The following is a list of works of sculpture, architecture, and painting by the Italian Baroque artist Gian Lorenzo Bernini. The numbering follows Rudolph Wittkower's Catalogue, published in 1966 in Gian Lorenzo Bernini: The Sculptor of the Roman Baroque.

Works

Notes

References

Further reading

External links
 Web Gallery of Art
 Map Showing the Location of Bernini's Works in Rome

Bernini
Bernini
Works by Gian Lorenzo Bernini
Lists of sculptures